Schlup v. Delo, 513 U.S. 298 (1995), was a case in which the United States Supreme Court expanded the ability to reopen a case in light of new evidence of innocence.

Petitioner Lloyd E. Schlup, Jr., a Missouri prisoner under a sentence of death for the 1984 murder of an inmate named Arthur Dade, filed a habeas corpus petition alleging that constitutional error deprived the jury of critical evidence that would have established his innocence. At trial, the state's evidence consisted of the testimony of two corrections officers who had witnessed the murder. Schlup's defense was that the videotape from a camera in the dining room showed that he was not the man that killed Arthur Dade. Schlup was denied his federal habeas corpus petition and filed a second petition alleging ineffective counsel. However, he did not argue his ineffective counsel claim in his first habeas corpus petition. Due to this, he was procedurally barred from arguing his case unless he could show that he was actually innocent and his conviction would be a miscarriage of justice. The Court granted certiorari to consider whether the Sawyer v. Whitley standard provides adequate protection against the kind of miscarriage of justice that would result from the execution of a person who is actually innocent.

Opinion of the Court 
The Court held that the standard of Murray v. Carrier, which requires a habeas petitioner to show that "a constitutional violation has probably resulted in the conviction of one who is actually innocent," id., at 496—rather than the more stringent Sawyer standard, governs the miscarriage of justice inquiry when a petitioner who has been sentenced to death raises a claim of actual innocence to avoid a procedural bar to the consideration of the merits of his constitutional claims. The exception is dependent on the petitioner's credible showing of innocence with reliable evidence. To meet the standard in Murray v. Carrier, the petitioner must show that it is more likely than not that no juror would have convicted given the new evidence. The Supreme Court remanded for determination of whether Schlup showed this evidence as required by Carrier.

Subsequent developments 
In 1996, Schlup was granted a writ of habeas corpus on the ground that his original trial attorney failed to adequately represent him. In 1999, on the second day of his re-trial, Schlup agreed to plead guilty to second degree murder which allowed him to avoid the death penalty. Sclup's co-defendant, Robert Earl O'Neal, was executed for his role in Dade's murder in 1995.

See also
 List of United States Supreme Court cases, volume 513
 List of United States Supreme Court cases by the Rehnquist Court

References

External links
 

United States Supreme Court cases
United States Supreme Court cases of the Rehnquist Court
United States death penalty case law
Capital punishment in Missouri
1995 in United States case law